Milan Stojanović was a Yugoslav association football goalkeeper. He was member of the Yugoslavia national team at the 1930 FIFA World Cup, but was never capped for his country.

References

External links

1911 births
Year of death missing
Yugoslav footballers
1930 FIFA World Cup players
Association football goalkeepers